Nolay is a municipality located in the province of Soria, in the autonomous community of Castile and León, Spain.

References

Municipalities in the Province of Soria